This is a list of diplomatic missions of Austria, excluding honorary consulates.

Current missions

Africa

Americas

Asia

Europe

Oceania

Multilateral organizations

Gallery

Closed missions

Africa

Americas

Europe

See also
 Foreign relations of Austria
 Visa policy of the Schengen Area

Notes

References
 Ministry of Foreign Affairs of Austria

 
Diplomatic missions
Austria